Jennifer Johnston may refer to:

 Jennifer Johnston (novelist) (born 1930), Irish novelist
 Jennifer Johnston (mezzo-soprano), English opera singer
 Jennifer Johnston (politician), American politician from Alaska

See also
 Jenifer Johnston, Scottish journalist
Jennifer Johnson (disambiguation)
Jenny Johnson (disambiguation)